Narasingha Malla Deb, O.B.E. (22 January 1907 – 11 November 1976) was a member of the Parliament of India and the 18th Raja of Jhargram, which he led from 1916 until the abolition of zamindaris by the West Bengal State Acquisition and Tenancy Act of 1950.

Early years and accession
Narasingha Malla Deb's ancestors traveled from Rajasthan with Man Singh to conquer the Bengal region on behalf of the third Mughal emperor, Akbar. They defeated the local Malla tribal rulers and took the name Malla Deb. The family belonged to the Chauhan clan of Rajputs.

Narasingha was the only son of Chandi Charan Malla Deb, the titular Raja of Jhargram, and his wife, Rani Kumud Kumari, the princess of Dhalbhumgarh. His father died when he was a child, and Narasingha assumed his titles and responsibilities after nine years of control by the Court of Wards. He was enthroned shortly afterward.

He and his sister, Vishnupriya, were raised by their mother. The governor of Bengal appointed Professor Debendra Mohan Bhattacharya of Dacca to groom Narasingha as a zamindar. As a child, he was sent to Midnapore Collegiate School and then to Presidency College in Kolkata, where he obtained a degree in history.

With his full name and title, Narasingha was known as Raja Bahadur Narasingha Malla Ugal Sanda Deb, OBE, Zamindar, Jhargram.

Work as Zamindar
From 1922 to 1950, with Professor Battacharya as administrator, Jhargram developed into a township, and many educational institutions were established. The Kumud Kumari Institution was founded in 1924. In 1925, an annual sports fund was created to encourage athletic activities and to construct a football stadium and the Jhargram Club. Malla Deb established Jhargram Agricultural College, which was later renamed Jhargram Raj College, as well as Vidyasagar Polytechnic for industrial training. He provided funds to set up Sri Ramkrishna Saradapeeth Girls High School and Bharat Sevashram Sangha. In 1931, he commissioned a new palace on 23 acres of land; it is a prominent example of Indo-Saracenic architecture. During World War II, he constructed Dudhkundi Airfield for the United States Air Force and provided the Allied forces with elephants, vehicles, and other help.

With the consent of the governor of Bengal, Malla Deb established a hospital for lower-class residents of Jhargram in his late father's name: Chandi Charan Charitable Hospital. Later, similar hospitals were established in every tehsil to serve nearby villages. The zamindar donated land to the Roman Catholic Church of India and to the Muslim community to build Nurrani Jama Masjid, a mosque, in Jhargram. In 1947, more land was acquired, and the Rani Binode Manjuri Government Girls' School—now one of the premier schools in Midnapore—was built.

In Midnapore, he founded the Tuberculosis Chest Clinic and the Homeopathic College, and gave donations for the construction of the Vidyasagar Memorial and the purchase of books for a library. He also bore all of the expenses to build the Midnapore Club and Jhargram Stadium. (It was renamed Aurobinda Stadium after his death.) Between 1928 and 1950, he contributed hundreds of thousands of rupees to welfare causes. In 1947, he gave 10,000 bighas of land to poor farmers, making him the single largest land donor in West Bengal. His beneficiaries ranged from the Kolkata Bangiya Sahitya Parishad to New Delhi Kali Bari.

After losing his zamindari, Malla Deb served for two terms as a member of the Legislative Council of Bengal. He also served in the Lok Sabha, the lower house of the Indian Parliament.

Personal life
In 1930, Malla Deb married Binode Manjari Devi, daughter of the Lal Saheb Girish Chandra Bhanja Deo of Mayurbhanj, a major feudal state in Odisha. They had two children: a son, Yuvraj Birendra Bijoy Malla Deb, born in 1931, and a daughter, Rajkumari Savitri Devi, born in 1943. After his first wife died in 1944, he married Rupa Manjari Devi, with whom he had two daughters: Rajkumari Gayatri Devi and Rajkumari Jayshree Devi.

He was an angler and hunter, for which he won trophies that are still kept in the Jhargram Palace. He went to Odisha for hunting with his friend Zaminder Krishnananda Hota, Zaminder of Dubrajpur He was also a photographer and won international prizes from the United States, Switzerland, Singapore, and the Soviet Union. He had a deep knowledge of Vaishnav Sangeet music and organized regular concerts at the palace.

Malla Deb died on 11 November 1976 in Kolkata.

Legacy
Malla Deb was known for working to rehabilitate Bengali Hindus from East Bengal in Jhargram and Midnapore during the partition of India. After India gained its independence, he owned businesses in Kolkata and large real estate properties in Kolkata, Midnapore, and Digha. His son Yuvraj Birendra Bijoy got involved in politics and was a two-time member of the Legislative Assembly of West Bengal from Jhargram's Vidhan Sabha constituency, representing the Indian National Congress. His son Shivendra Bijoy Malla Deb—Narasingha Malla Deb's grandson—is a social worker and politician associated with the All India Trinamool Congress, and the chairman of Jhargram Municipality.

Honours

King George V Silver Jubilee Medal
Officer of The Most Excellent Order of the British Empire, bestowed on him by King George VI on 12 June 1941.
Raja title, conferred upon him by Lord Wavell the Viceroy of India on 8 June 1944

See also
Jhargram Raj
Jhargram Palace
Jhargram Raj College

References

1907 births
1976 deaths
Members of the Parliament of India
West Bengal politicians